Antonio, Anthony or Tony Cruz may refer to:

 Antonio Cruz (cyclist) (born 1971), American road bicycle racer
 Antonio Cruz Torres (born 1957), Dominican businessman and politician
 Antonio Cruz (swimmer) (born 1952), Guatemalan swimmer
 Antonio Cruz Villalón (born 1948), Spanish architect
 AZ (rapper) (Anthony Cruz, born 1972), American rapper
 Anthony Cruz (field hockey) (born 1956), Malaysian Olympic hockey player
 Anthony S. Cruz (born 1956), Hong Kong Thoroughbred jockey and horse trainer
 Tony Cruz (baseball) (born 1986), Major League Baseball player for the Kansas City Royals

See also
 Antonio de la Cruz (born 1947), Spanish football player and manager
 Antonio de la Cruz (1480–1550), Roman Catholic bishop of Islas Canarias
 Tony dela Cruz (born 1978), Filipino-American basketball player
 Estádio Antônio Cruz, Brazilian football venue